The Kiss may refer to:

Art 
 The Kiss (Brâncuși sculpture), a 1908 sculpture by Constantin Brâncuși
 The Kiss (Hayez painting), an 1859 painting by Francesco Hayez
 The Kiss (Klimt painting), a 1907 golden painting by Gustav Klimt
 The Kiss (Munch painting), an 1897 oil painting by Edvard Munch
 The Kiss (Rodin sculpture), an 1889 sculpture by Auguste Rodin
 V-J Day in Times Square, a 1945 photograph by Alfred Eisenstaedt
 Le Baiser de l'hôtel de ville (The Kiss by the Hôtel de Ville or just The Kiss), a photograph by Robert Doisneau
 The Kiss, a statue by Sophie Ryder

Film and television
 The Kiss (1896 film), an 18-second film reenactment of the last scene of the stage musical The Widow Jones
 The Kiss (1900 film), a 45-second film with Fred Ott
 The Kiss (1914 film), a silent film directed by Ulysses Davis
 The Kiss (1921 film), a silent film directed by Jack Conway, starring Carmel Myers
 The Kiss (1929 film), a silent film directed by Jacques Feyder, starring Greta Garbo
 The Kiss (1958 film), a short film nominated for an Academy Award
 The Kiss (1983 film), a film directed by Roman Balayan
 The Kiss (1988 film), a horror film directed by Pen Densham
 The Kiss (1992 film), a film with a score by Nathan Wang
 The Kiss (1995 film), a pornographic film starring Jenna Jameson
 The Kiss, a 2002 short film by the Russo brothers
 The Kiss (2003 film), a comedy-drama directed by Gorman Bechard
 The Kiss (2004 film) (Dutch: De kus), a Belgian film directed by Hilde Van Mieghem
 The Kiss (2007 film), a Japanese crime film
 "The Kiss" (Even Stevens), an episode of Even Stevens
 "The Kiss" (The Amazing World of Gumball), an episode of The Amazing World of Gumball
 "The Kiss" (Modern Family), an episode of Modern Family

Literature
 The Kiss (novel), a novel by Danielle Steel
 The Kiss (memoir), a memoir by Kathryn Harrison
 "The Kiss", a short story by Anton Chekhov
 "The Kiss", a short story by Kate Chopin

Music
 The Kiss (opera), an 1876 work by Bedřich Smetana
"A Kiss", Dargomïzhsky
"The Kiss", Philip Green (composer) (1911-1982) 
"The Kiss", Joseph Barnby (1838-1896)

Albums
 The Kiss (album), an album by Trin-i-tee 5:7
 The Kiss and Other Movements, an album by Michael Nyman, with a title track based on a painting of the same name by Paul Richards
 The Kiss, an album by Bikeride

Songs
 "The Kiss", a song by The Cure from Kiss Me, Kiss Me, Kiss Me
 "The Kiss", a song by Dweezil Zappa from Confessions
 "The Kiss", a song by Hooverphonic from Hooverphonic Presents Jackie Cane
 "The Kiss", a song by Judee Sill from Heart Food
 "The Kiss", a song by Queen from the Flash Gordon soundtrack album
 "The Kiss", a song by The Sea and Cake from The Biz
 "The Kiss", a song by Patrick Wolf from The Magic Position
 "The Kiss", an instrumental by Trevor Jones & Randy Edelman The Last of the Mohicans soundtrack album

See also
 Kiss (disambiguation)